Queen Sado of the Park clan (? - February 614) was a Queen Consort of Silla as the spouse of king King Jinheung of Silla, and the mother of his successor, King Jinji of Silla. According to the disputed text Hwarang Segi, she was regent during the minority of her grandson King Jinpyeong but her regent is not mentioned in the historical texts Samguk sagi or Samguk yusa. She later became a Buddhist nun under the name Myobeop (묘법, 妙法).

Life

Early life 
She was born to Park Yeong-sil and Princess Okjin of the Gyeongju Kim clan. She became the consort of the king early. The Hwarangsegi chronicle claimed that she married the king as early as the age of seven. During the last years of her husband's reign, he entered the temple of Yeongheungsa, and she followed him there.

Queen mother
In 576 her spouse died, and was succeeded by their son. According to Hwarang Segi: It is said that he was dethroned by his mother, Queen Sado, for refusing to marry her niece (in some accounts, sister) Mishil. He made a promise to marry her and make her his Queen once he became a king but had a change of heart as soon as he took over the throne. He lost interest on her after falling deeply in love with another woman. They spread a rumor that heavens has forsaken Silla for having an immoral king, thus resulted for them losing their lands against the Baekje. They asked him to abdicate in order to appease the heaven. He was then sent to confinement and died 3 months later. His nephew who was only 10 years old at that time, was then announced as a new king but since he was still too young to rule, Queen Sado acted as his regent for years.

Regency
Her grandson was a minor, and she became regent during his minority. Since King Jinpyeong was only 13 years old when he ascended the throne, Queen Dowager Sado, served as a regent until he reached the legal age in 584. However, Queen Sado still refused to give him full control of Silla even after he reached the legal age. She appointed Noribu, as the Sangdaedeung and Hujik as the head of the Military. Noribu died on December of 588, Sueulbu became the next Sangdaedeung after him. King Jinpyeong relied heavily on these two chief officials to solidify his kingdom in both internal affairs and international relations. He also gave the rank of Galmunwang to his brothers Baekban and Gukban, to solidify his power in the court.

Family
 Father - Park Yeong-sil (박영실, 朴英失), Lord Gioh (기오공)
 Grandfather - Suji Park (수지 박씨)
 Grandmother - Princess Bohyeon of the Gyeongju Kim clan (보현공주 김씨)
 Mother - Princess Okjin of the Gyeongju Kim clan (옥진궁주 김씨)
 Grandfather - Wi Hwarang (위화랑, 魏花郞)
 Grandmother - Lady Ohdo (오도부인, 吾道夫人)
 Stepmother - Queen Dowager Jiso of the Gyeongju Kim clan (지소태후) (? - 574)
 Step grandfather - King Beopheung of Silla (법흥왕) (? - July 540)
 Step grandmother - Queen Bodo of the Gyeongju Kim clan (보도왕후 김씨)
 Siblings
 Older half-sister - Princess Hwanghwa (황화공주)
 Older half-sister - Princess Songhwa (송화공주)
 Brother-in-law - Bokseung Galmunwang (복승 갈문왕, 福勝 葛文王)
 Half-niece - Queen Maya of the Gyeongju Kim clan (마야부인 김씨, 摩耶夫人 金氏)
 Half-nephew - Kim Ho-rim (김호림, 金虎林) (579 - ?)
 Half-niece - Lady Horin (호린부인, 護璘夫人)
 Older sister - Lady Myodo (묘도부인, 妙道夫人); Mi Jin-hu’s first wife
 Brother-in-law - Mi Jin-bu (미진부, 未珍夫) (525 - ?)
 Niece - Lady Mi Shil (미실, 美室) (546 / 548 - 612)
 Nephew - Mi Saeng (미생, 美生) (550 - 609?)
 Younger sister - Lady Heungdo (흥도부인, 興道夫人)
 Niece - Lady Jindo of the Suji Park clan (지도부인 박씨, 知道夫人 朴氏)
 Husband - King Jinheung of Silla (진흥왕) (534 - 576)
 Father-in-law - Galmunwang Ibjong (입종 갈문왕)
 Mother-in-law - Queen Dowager Jiso of the Gyeongju Kim clan (지소태후) (? - 574)
 Children
 Son - Crown Prince Dongryun (동륜태자) (? - 572)
 Daughter-in-law - Lady Manho of the Gyeongju Kim clan (만호부인 김씨)
 Grandson - King Jinpyeong of Silla (진평왕, 眞平王)
 Grandson - Kim Baek-ban, King Galmun (김백반 갈문왕) 
 Grandson - Kim Guk-ban, King Galmun (김국반 갈문왕) (572 - ?)
 Daughter-in-law - Lady Mi Shil (미실, 美室) (546/548 - 612)
 Granddaughter - Princess Aesong (애송공주, 艾松公主)
 Son - King Jinji of Silla (신라 진지왕) (? - 24 August 579)
 Daughter-in-law - Lady Jindo of the Suji Park clan (지도부인 박씨, 知道夫人 朴氏)
 Grandson - Kim Yong-su (김용수, 金龍樹) (579 - 646)
 Daughter-in-law - Princess Bomyeong of the Gu clan (보명궁주 구씨)
 Son - Kim Gu-Ryun (김구륜)
 Daughter-in-law - Princess Banya of the Gyeongju Kim clan (반야공주 김씨)
 Grandson - Kim Su-pom (김수품)
 Daughter-in-law - Princess Bohwa (보화공주)
 Grandson - Kim Seon-pom (김선품, 金善品) (607 - 643)
 Daughter - Princess Taeyang (태양공주)
 Daughter - Princess Ayang (아양공주)
 Daughter - Princess Eunryun (은륜공주)
 Daughter - Princess Wolryun (월륜공주)

References

 Il-yeon: Samguk Yusa: Legends and History of the Three Kingdoms of Ancient Korea, translated by Tae-Hung Ha and Grafton K. Mintz. Book One, page 52. Silk Pagoda (2006). 

6th-century births
614 deaths
Royal consorts of Silla
7th-century Korean women
6th-century Korean women
6th-century women rulers
Regents of Korea